Sir George Stephen  (1794 – 20 June 1879) was a British solicitor, barrister, author and anti-slavery proponent. A man of ability and force of character, he was upright and outspoken. Quarrelsome and short-tempered, he became involved in disputes that damaged his career.

Background and education
Stephen was the fourth  and youngest son of James Stephen, C.B., by his marriage with Ann, only child of Henry Stent, of Stoke Newington, a village then just north of London. He was the brother of the Right Hon. Sir James Stephen, for many years Under-Secretary of State in the Colonial Office, whose policy he for a long period initiated and controlled. One of his cousins was  Sir Alfred Stephen.

Born in 1794 at Saint Kitts, George Stephen was originally intended for the medical profession; but after spending three years in the study of anatomy, and going through a two-years' course at Magdalene College, Cambridge. He left Cambridge without graduating, after doing brilliant work, and entered the office of Messrs. Kaye & Freshfield, solicitors to the Bank of England. Having served his articles, he went into practice on his own account, and was engaged by the Government to obtain evidence against Queen Caroline, of whose guilt he was convinced.

Abolitionism
It was, however, in connection with the movement for the abolition of slavery in the British colonies that he mainly distinguished himself. His father (James Stephen) had married, as his second wife, the sister of William Wilberforce, and was allied with that great man, Zachary Macaulay, Thomas Clarkson, and others in the abolition of the slave trade, achieved in 1807. In the legitimate development of that noble work, which ended in the suppression of slavery, as well as of the slave trade, throughout the British dominions. He was critical of Wilberforce (and the old guard of the movement in general) as being indecisive and too ready to compromise.  Wilberforce, he said, was excessively deferential to "rank and power".  Sir George Stephen bore a leading part, and it was his decision (extorted from him by the necessities of the case) in favour of admitting the principle of compensation (Compensated emancipation, paying the slave owners for the loss of their "property") that brought the agitation to a much earlier successful issue than could otherwise have been ensured.

Later life and Australia
Sir George (who was knighted in 1837, being the first so honoured after Queen Victoria's accession) subsequently ceased to practise as a solicitor, with a view to being called to the Bar. This was accomplished, in 1849, under the auspices of Gray's Inn; and Sir George then removed to Liverpool, where he practised at the local Bar for some years.

Business falling off, Stephen determined to follow his two sons to Australia, and took up his residence in Melbourne in 1855. Though this step was afterwards a matter of regret with him, he did fairly well at the Victorian Bar, principally in insolvency cases, and became a Q.C. in 1871. In 1866 he acted as Commissioner of Insolvent Estates at Geelong.

He died in Caulfield, Victoria on 20 June 1879.

Works
In addition to an autobiography written for his children, Sir George published, in 1839, anonymously, Adventures of an Attorney in Search of a Practice; and was also the author of The Jesuit at Cambridge, published the same year; and of Adventures of a Gentleman in Search of a Horse, a brochure intended to illustrate in an amusing form the operation of the warranty law, which ran through half a dozen editions. Sir George also wrote several orthodox law books and a "Life of Christ."

Family
Sir George married, in 1821, Henrietta, eldest daughter of the Rev. William Ravenscroft, Prebendary of Down Cathedral, Ireland, who died in 1869. Their son was James Wilberforce Stephen, later Attorney-General of Victoria and Supreme Court judge.

Mr. Justice FitzJames Stephen and  Leslie Stephen were nephews of Sir George Stephen, being the sons of his brother, the late Right Hon. Sir James Stephen.

References

External links

1794 births
1879 deaths
Alumni of Magdalene College, Cambridge
19th-century Australian lawyers
English emigrants to colonial Australia
English abolitionists
Stephen-Bell family
19th-century English lawyers
Australian King's Counsel